Chilișoaia may refer to:

 Chilișoaia, a village in Boldurești Commune, Nisporeni district, Moldova
 Chilișoaia, a village in Dumești Commune, Iași County, Romania